WALTR is a proprietary software developed by Softorino. It is a conversion and transversion application that converts and transfers music, video, ringtone, and PDF files directly onto Apple iOS devices (iPhone, iPad, and iPod Touch) with limited support of non-iOS devices (iPod Classic, Nano, Mini, and Shuffle).

History
The software was initially released in 2014 as WALTR, allowing users to transfer video and audio files from Mac or Windows computers onto iPhone, iPad, or iPod Touch with iOS 5 or higher installed. Version 2.0 was released to the public on October 28, 2016.

General information
Utilising WALTR, media files can be transferred into iPhone or iPad without using iTunes. It takes away the need to use iTunes or any third-party apps in iOS. All files transferred through WALTR are placed into the stock media players preinstalled by Apple on all iOS devices.

Full list of formats supported in WALTR 2: 
Audio: m4a, m4b (Audiobooks), MP3, AAC, FLAC, cue, WAV, AIFF, APE, TTA, TAK, WV, WMA, OGG, OGA, DFF, DSF
Video: mp4, MKV, AVI, m4v, MOV, 3gp, FLV, MTS, TS, mpg, m2v, dv, WMV, WEBM, RM, RMVB, VOB, m2ts
Books: PDF and EPUB
Ringtones: M4R
Subtitles: SRT, ass, SSA

The app works on macOS and Windows PC.

Press
WALTR has received press reviews from more than 100 editions, including Forbes USA, 
Wired.it, 
Gizmodo, and FOX6Now.

Similar software
 Hand Brake
 iExplorer
 iMazing

Interesting facts
 Program was named after Walter White – the character in the American crime-drama TV series Breaking Bad.
 The application allows for watching 4K video files on iPhone 6, though developers state that the highest resolution supported by iPhone`s screen is 1080p (iPhone 6 Plus, iPhone 6S Plus). While testing WALTR 1.0.2 for Mac, 4K video from Samsung Smart TV demos was put into an iPhone which the iPhone played back. Since Apple TV uses chips from the iPhone, it was likely that the next generation of Apple TV would support 4K resolution.

See also
 Data compression
 Ripping
 Video codec
 Audio codec

References

Further reading

External links 
 

2014 software
Cross-platform software
Proprietary software
IOS software
MacOS multimedia software
Windows multimedia software
Video conversion software
Audio codecs